PDF24 Creator is an application software by Geek Software GmbH for the creation of PDF files from any application and for converting files to the PDF format. The application is released under a proprietary freeware license.

The software has been developed in Germany since 2006 and is actively developed. It is available in 32 languages, including English and German.

Functions and features 
PDF24 Creator is installed as a virtual printer via a device driver in the operating system. This allows PDF files to be created directly from any application that provides a printing function. The commands sent are then used to create a PDF file. PDF24 Creator uses the free PDF interpreter Ghostscript, which is automatically installed as a private instance for the PDF24 Creator. After printing a document on the PDF printer, a wizard opens automatically, where the created PDF file can be edited or further worked on.

The PDF24 Creator is also able to merge multiple documents to one PDF file and to extract pages. Compressing PDF files to shrink the file size is also possible. Since version 10.0.0 an added toolbox is present as well.

Some features of the software include, but are not limited to:
 Merge multiple PDF into one file
 Rotating, extracting, inserting pages
 Integrated preview for PDF editing
 PDF encryption, decryption and signing
 Change PDF information (author, title, etc.)
 Compress and shrink PDF files
 Add a watermark or stamp a PDF file
 Combine pages with a digital paper
 Convert to and from PDF
 Multiple PDF printers for different purposes since 7.7.0
 Full featured and lightweight PDF reader since version 8.7.0
 Tesseract OCR engine since version 8.8.0
 Blackening of PDF files since version 10.0.0

Distribution and fields of application 
PDF24 Creator is credited with more than 5 million downloads within the top 3 (2017-01-17) in the category "PDF Software" on the German site Chip.de.

See also 
 List of PDF software
 List of virtual printer software

References

External links 
 

PDF software
Windows-only freeware